Mordechai "Motti" Mishani (10 April 1945 – 9 April 2013) was an Israeli politician who served as a member of the Knesset for One Israel and Gesher between 2001 and 2003.

Biography
Born in Tel Aviv during the Mandate era, Mishani studied law before working as an attorney.

A member of Gesher, he was placed 29th on the One Israel list (an alliance of Labor, Meimad and Gesher) for the 1999 elections, but missed out on a seat when the alliance won only 26 seats. However, he entered the Knesset on 17 February 2001 as a replacement for Eli Goldschmidt. On 7 March Gesher left the One Israel alliance to sit as an independent party. Prior to the 2003 elections Mishani joined Likud, but after only being placed 102nd on the party's list, he lost his seat.

Mishani died on 9 April 2013.

References

External links

1945 births
2013 deaths
People from Tel Aviv
Israeli lawyers
Gesher (political party) politicians
One Israel politicians
Members of the 15th Knesset (1999–2003)
Burials at Yarkon Cemetery